The South African Railways Class 6A 4-6-0 of 1896 was a steam locomotive from the pre-Union era in the Cape of Good Hope.

In 1896 and 1897, the Cape Government Railways placed a second batch of fifty 6th Class 4-6-0 steam locomotives in service, forty-one on its Western System, six on its Midland System and three on its Eastern System. During the Second Boer War, four of them were transferred to the Imperial Military Railways on loan, and in 1907 one was sold to the Benguela Railway in Angola. In 1912, when the remaining forty-nine locomotives were assimilated into the South African Railways, they were renumbered and designated Class 6A.

Manufacturers
The 6th Class 4-6-0 passenger steam locomotive was designed at the Salt River works of the Cape Government Railways (CGR) at the same time as the 7th Class, both according to the specifications of Michael Stephens, at the time the Chief Locomotive Superintendent of the CGR, and under the supervision of H.M. Beatty, at the time the Locomotive Superintendent of the Cape Western System.

Between 1895 and 1897, the fifty locomotives in this second batch of the 6th Class were built by Dübs and Company and Sharp, Stewart and Company. They were delivered in 1896 and 1897, numbered in the ranges from 161 to 201 for the CGR's Western System, 371 to 376 for the Midland System and 660 to 662 for the Eastern System.

These locomotives differed from those of the previous order by having slightly larger boilers with an increased heating surface.

Class 6 sub-classes
When the Union of South Africa was established on 31 May 1910, the three Colonial government railways (CGR, Natal Government Railways (NGR) and Central South African Railways (CSAR)) were united under a single administration to control and administer the railways, ports and harbours of the Union. Although the South African Railways and Harbours came into existence in 1910, the actual classification and renumbering of all the rolling stock of the three constituent railways were only implemented with effect from 1 January 1912.

In 1912, all but one of these fifty locomotives were assimilated into the SAR, designated Class 6A and renumbered in the range from 441 to 489.

The rest of the CGR's 6th Class locomotives, together with the Classes 6-L1 to 6-L3 locomotives which had been inherited by the CSAR from the Oranje-Vrijstaat Gouwerment-Spoorwegen (OVGS) via the Imperial Military Railways (IMR), were grouped into thirteen more sub-classes by the SAR. The  locomotives became SAR Classes 6, 6B to 6H and 6J to 6L, the  locomotives became Class 6Y and the  locomotives became Class 6Z.

Modifications
Several of the CSAR's Class 6-L1 to 6-L3 locomotives were modified by P.A Hyde, Chief Mechanical Engineer (CME) of the CSAR, by having their round-topped fireboxes replaced with larger boilers and Belpaire fireboxes and by having larger, more sheltered cabs installed. This conversion improved their performance tremendously and resulted in several of the Classes 6, 6A and 6B locomotives being similarly modified by the SAR in later years, but without altering their classifications.

During the 1930s, many of them were modified once again, when the CME of the SAR at the time, A.G. Watson, reboilered them with round-topped fireboxes once again, but retaining the larger cabs. Once again, they retained their classifications.

Service

South Africa
The Class 6 family of locomotives were introduced primarily as passenger locomotives, but when the class became displaced by larger and more powerful locomotive classes, it literally became a "Jack-of-all-trades" which proved itself as one of the most useful and successful locomotive classes ever to be designed at the Salt River shops. It went on to see service in all parts of the country, except in Natal, and was used on all types of traffic.

In July 1956 at 60 years of age, Class 6A Belpaire no. 482 was still in service at Port Elizabeth and at times still worked the mainline on work trains or pickup work. When she was eventually retired, she was plinthed inside the main entrance to the electric locomotive shops at Koedoespoort in Pretoria.

IMR, Angola and Sudan
One of these locomotives was sold to the Benguela Railway in Angola, while another four saw service with the IMR during the Second Boer War.

During the Second World War, sixteen of the Classes 6 to 6D were transferred to the Middle East to assist with the war effort during the North African Campaign. The four Class 6A locomotives in this group were numbers 465, 472, 475 and 479. They were sold to the Sudan Railways Corporation in 1942 and were renumbered in the range from M707 to M710, in the same order as their former SAR engine numbers.

Renumbering
During their long service lives, some of the Class 6A locomotives underwent multiple renumbering. All were initially numbered into the CGR's Western, Midland and Eastern Systems rosters. The Midland System's locomotives, numbered in the range from 371 to 376, were later renumbered in the range from 571 to 576. The then vacant engine numbers in the range from 371 to 376 were later re-allocated to Class 8D locomotives which were delivered in 1902.

The four locomotives which were loaned to the IMR during the Second Boer War, were renumbered C501, C503, C509 and C510 for the duration of their IMR service, while the one which was sold to Angola became the Benguela Railway's no. 21.

The remaining 49 locomotives were eventually renumbered into the SAR's roster in 1912 and received SAR numbers in the range from 441 to 489. The table reflects all their renumbering as well as their builders and works numbers.

Preserved Locomotives
Four of these Class 6A locomotives still exist.
 No. 454 Lauren is owned by Shaun Ackerman and is under restoration at Germiston Steam Depot.
 No. 462 is on static display at the Big Hole Museum at Kimberley.
 No. 473 Patricia is owned by Clive Holliday and under restoration at Germiston Steam Depot. It is being restored as SAR No. 473.
 No. 482 is plinthed at Pretoria’s Koedoespoort Workshops with a Sheldon Steam Crane. This engine is preserved in a safe and friendly environment.

Illustration
Round-topped fireboxes

Belpaire fireboxes

References

1320
1320
4-6-0 locomotives
2′C n2 locomotives
Steam locomotives of Sudan
Dübs locomotives
Sharp Stewart locomotives
Cape gauge railway locomotives
Railway locomotives introduced in 1896
1896 in South Africa
Passenger locomotives